Canta en Italiano (English Sing in Italian) is an EP by Mexican pop singer Daniela Romo. This album was released on 1983. This has 2 Italian versions of the sing "Mentiras" (Lies) and "La ocasión para amarnos" (The occasion to love each other) from her self-titled album.

Track listing
 Bugie →  Mentiras
 Dammi, dammi, dammi → La ocasión para amarnos

Daniela Romo albums
1983 EPs
Italian-language EPs